Pebble Creek is a stream in the U.S. state of Missouri.

The name "Pebble Creek" has been in use since at least 1949.

References

Rivers of Missouri
Rivers of St. Louis County, Missouri